Meet the Fockers is a 2004 American comedy film directed by Jay Roach and the sequel to the 2000 film Meet the Parents. The film stars Robert De Niro (who was also one of the film's producers), Ben Stiller, Dustin Hoffman, Barbra Streisand, Blythe Danner and Teri Polo. Despite mixed reviews, the film was a box office hit, grossing $522 million worldwide. It was followed by a sequel, Little Fockers, in 2010.

Plot
Two years after the events of the first film, Gaylord "Greg" Focker and his fiancée Pam Byrnes decide to introduce their parents to each other. They first fly to Oyster Bay, New York, to pick up Pam's father, retired CIA operative Jack Byrnes, her mother Dina, and Pam's one-year-old nephew, Jack "Little Jack" Banks (the son of Bob and Debbie Banks). Rather than going to the airport as planned, Jack decides to drive the family to Miami to meet Greg's parents in his new RV.

Once Greg, Pam, and Pam’s parents arrive in Miami, they are greeted by Greg's eccentric, fun-loving and free-spirited parents, Bernie Focker, a lawyer-turned-stay-at-home-dad, and Roz, a sex therapist for elderly couples. While Dina bonds with the Fockers, small cracks begin to form between Jack and the Fockers, due to their contrasting personalities and backgrounds. The gathering gets off to a bad start when a chase between the Fockers' dog, Moses, and the Byrneses' cat, Jinx, culminates with Jinx flushing Moses down the RV's toilet, forcing Bernie to destroy it to save Moses. Later, Bernie accidentally injures Jack's back during a game of touch football.

Pam informs Greg that she is pregnant, and the two decide to keep it a secret until they are married. Jack again becomes suspicious of Greg's character when they are introduced to the Fockers' former housekeeper, Isabel Villalobos. Bernie reveals that Greg lost his virginity to Isabel 15 years earlier. Isabel's 15-year-old son Jorge, who has never met his father and bears a striking resemblance to Greg, catches the attention of Jack after he repairs the toilet in the RV. Meanwhile, Roz, Bernie and Dina learn Pam is pregnant, but promise not to tell Jack.

Greg is left alone to babysit Little Jack, whom Jack has been raising via the Ferber method. Despite Jack's strict instructions to leave Little Jack to self-soothe, Greg is unable to stand listening to Little Jack's cries and attempts to cheer him up by hugging him and acting humorously, but inadvertently teaches him the word "asshole". Greg answers a brief phone call from Roz, and Little Jack is let out of the playpen by Jinx and he glues his hands to a bottle of rum, while saying asshole repeatedly, leading to an argument between Jack and the Fockers over each other's parenting methods.

Jack resumes his spying on Greg and sends Greg and Jorge's hair samples for a DNA test, while inviting Jorge to Greg and Pam's engagement party in hopes of getting Greg to admit he is Jorge's father. At the engagement party, Jack, who assumes that Greg knows about Jorge and has deliberately been keeping him a secret from Pam, introduces him to Jorge. Later, when Greg denies knowing anything about Jorge, Jack still refuses to believe him and drugs him with a shot of truth serum. While giving a toast, Greg uncontrollably blurts out that Pam is pregnant and that Jorge is his son before losing consciousness.

The next morning, Pam questions Greg about Jorge, and Greg promises that he knew nothing about him before the previous evening. Pam believes him and is willing to work things out with him. Jack has reached his breaking point and demands that Pam and Dina leave with him. Dina refuses and reveals that Jack had drugged Greg. Everyone turns against Jack and informs him that they were all aware of Pam's pregnancy but didn't tell him due to his paranoia and inability to trust people. Shocked and hurt, Jack leaves with his grandson.

Bernie and Greg pursue Jack but are tasered and arrested by incompetent Officer Vern LeFlore for speeding and refusing to remain in Bernie’s car when pulled over. Meanwhile, Jack receives the results of the DNA test that determines Jorge's father is really a baseball player who also resembles Greg, leading to Little Jack calling him an "asshole", to which Jack agrees. When Jack sees Bernie and Greg being pulled over, he attempts to defend them, but LeFlore tasers and arrests him as well. In their cell, Greg, Jack, and Bernie are released by Judge Ira, a client of Roz. Before they leave, Greg asks that Jack and Bernie stop their feud. Jack admits that he made a mistake regarding Jorge and explains his past career in the CIA to Bernie before apologizing for his actions. 

Greg and Pam are married that weekend by Pam's former fiancé, Kevin, who is now an ordained interfaith minister. At the conclusion, Jack reviews the tape to find out why the Ferber method failed. It turned out that Little Jack was comforted by Roz each time he cried, who took care of him and let him nap, proving the Ferber method failed. Bernie was seen feeding him chocolates and angering Jack. The climax ends with Greg playing with Little Jack and calling out Jack, which makes Little Jack laugh as he turns off the TV.

Cast

Reception

Critical response 
Rotten Tomatoes reported that 38% of 164 sampled critics gave Meet the Fockers positive reviews, with an average rating of 5.20/10. The site's consensus is "Talented cast is wasted as the movie is content with recycling jokes from its predecessor, Meet the Parents." At Metacritic, which assigns a weighted average score out of 100 with reviews from mainstream critics, the film received an average score of 41 based on 34 reviews, indicating "mixed or average reviews". Audiences polled by CinemaScore gave the film an average rating of "B+" on an A+ to F scale.

Box office 
The film was a commercial success and is currently the second highest-grossing film starring Robert De Niro. The film grossed $46,120,980 on its opening weekend in North America (5,000 screens at 3,518 theaters, averaging $13,110 per theater, or $9,224 per screen). By the end of the film's 149 days of release, it had grossed a total of $279,261,160 in North America, and $243,396,776 in other territories, for a total worldwide gross of $522,657,936, with an estimated 44 million tickets sold in the US. The film's budget was $80 million.

Awards and nominations

2005: Casting Society Of America, USA: Nominated for Best Feature Film Casting: Comedy.
2005: Teen Choice Awards: Nominated for Choice Movie: Blush, Choice Movie Actor: Comedy, Choice Movie Actor: Comedy, Choice Movie: Liar.
2005: MTV Movie Awards Won: Best Comedic Performance.
2005: ASCAP Film and Television Music Awards: Won Top Box Office Films.
2005: MTV Movie Awards in Mexico: Nominated for Best International Movie.

Sequel 
A sequel to the film, titled Little Fockers, was released on December 22, 2010.

References

External links

 
 
 
 
 
 

2004 films
2004 comedy films
2000s English-language films
2000s American films
American comedy films
American interfaith romance films
American sequel films
Films about weddings
Films set in Miami
Films set in Florida
Films scored by Randy Newman
Films with screenplays by John Hamburg
Films produced by Robert De Niro
Films directed by Jay Roach
Universal Pictures films
DreamWorks Pictures films